This is a list of Billboard magazine's top 30 singles of 1955 according to retail sales.

See also
1955 in music

References

1955 record charts
Billboard charts